Gen may refer to:

 Gen (film), 2006 Turkish horror film directed by Togan Gökbakar 
 Gen (Street Fighter), a video game character from the Street Fighter series
 Gen Fu, a video game character from the Dead or Alive series
 Gen language, the language of Togo
 Gen-san, a character in the anime series Sky Girls
, Japanese Nordic combined skier
, Japanese singer-songwriter, musician, actor, and writer
, Japanese footballer
, Japanese novelist, visual novel writer and anime screenwriter
, Japanese engineer and businessman
, Japanese politician
, Japanese ballet dancer and choreographer
Generation as in GenX, GenZ, etc.

Gen. or GEN may refer to:
 General officer, a high senior rank in the military
 GEN Corporation, of Japan
 Gen Digital, a computer security software company in United States
 GEN Energija, a state-owned power company in Slovenia
 GEN, a website published by Medium
 Global Ecovillage Network
 Global Editors Network
 Gewestelijk ExpresNet, Dutch name for the Brussels Regional Express Network, a commuter rail service
Genitive case

Japanese masculine given names